Fawcett Memorial Hospital is a 238 bed for profit acute-care hospital at 21298 Olean Boulevard in Port Charlotte, Florida. It is owned by Hospital Corporation of America (commonly known as HCA). The hospital's slogan is "Our family caring for yours." It is certified in many fields, including stroke, cardiology/chest pain, and cancer.

References 

Hospital buildings completed in 1975
Hospitals in Florida
Buildings and structures in Charlotte County, Florida
HCA Healthcare
1975 establishments in Florida